Following is a sortable list of museums in Tunisia.

See also

Culture of Tunisia
List of museums

External links 
Tunisia Museums
"Tunisia Tourism" (in French)

Tunisia
List
Tunisia education-related lists
Lists of buildings and structures in Tunisia
Museums
Tunisia